A zig-zag bridge is a pedestrian bridge composed of short segments, each set at an angle relative to its neighbors and usually with an alternating right and left turn required when traveling across the bridge.

When constructed of wood, each segment is formed from planks and is supported by posts. When constructed of stone, the bridge will use short or long rectilinear slabs set upon stone footings.

Garden and ceremonial bridge

A zig-zag bridge is  often seen in the Chinese garden, Japanese garden, and Zen rock garden. It may be made of stone slabs or planks as part of a pond design and is frequently seen in rustic gardens.  It is also used in high art modern fountain gardens, often in public urban park and botanic garden landscapes.

The objective in employing such a bridge, constructed according to Zen philosophy and teachings, is to focus the walker's attention to the mindfulness of the current place and time moment - "being here, now". As it often has no railings, it is quite possible for an inattentive walker to simply fall off an end into the water.

The zig-zag of paths and bridges also follows a principle of Chinese Feng Shui.

Standard bridge
The post and plank version has an advantage when employed as a crossing of a muddy bottom or marsh: It is structurally stable, where a straight bridge might tend to tip due to the posts moving in the soft mud. Each segment of walkway mutually supports the next from twisting and tipping by being securely fastened to it. This is the same advantage possessed by a zig-zag split rail fence.

See also
Footbridge
Moon bridge
S bridge
Step-stone bridge

References

External links

myjapanesegarden: Building a zig-zag garden pond bridge, UK.

Footbridges
Stone bridges
Garden features
Stonemasonry
Chinese gardening styles
Japanese style of gardening
Bridges